Julie Bargmann (born 1958 in Bergen County) is an American landscape architect and educator. Bargmann is currently Professor of Landscape Architecture at the University of Virginia School of Architecture, and founding principal of D.I.R.T. (Dump It Right There) Studio, a landscape architecture firm.

Career
Bargmann was born to, James F. Bargmann, a salesman, and Alice Badenhope, a graduate of the University of Toledo in 1947, in Bergen County as one of eight children. She received a Bachelor of Fine Arts in Sculpture from Carnegie Mellon University and a Master in Landscape Architecture from the Harvard University Graduate School of Design in 1987, where she was a classmate of Anita Berrizbeitia.

After graduating from Harvard, Bargmann worked alongside Michael Van Valkenburgh, while also teaching at the University of Minnesota. In 1992, Bargmann founded D.I.R.T (Dump It Right There), a landscape design studio based in Charlottesville, Virginia. She turned items that were commonly seen as trash into sculptures and art. Her studio focused on repurposing former landfill sites into public spaces such as parks and playgrounds. Shortly thereafter, Bargmann accepted a position at the University of Virginia School of Architecture, while continuing to run D.I.R.T. Studio

In 1998, Bargmann became a contributing editor to the Landscape Journal, published by the University of Wisconsin Press.

In 2021, Bargmann delivered the annual Daniel Urban Kiley Lecture at the Harvard University Graduate School of Design.

Projects

Bargmann collaborated with Stacy Levy, as well as various artists, historians, and local community members in Vitondale, Pennsylvania, to reconstruct acid mine drainage into Vintondale Reclamation Park.

In 2000, Bargmann and architect William McDonough collaborated to repurpose the Ford Motor Corporation plant in Dearborn, Michigan. As the site was heavily polluted, they received two billion dollars to render it ecologically friendly.

A decade later, Bargmann was hired to renovate the headquarters of Urban Outfitters in an abandoned shipyard. She constructed the exterior landscaping around the building to include pathways, lawns, and dog parks. As part of the land, it included a working United States Navy base.

Honors
 Fellow of the American Academy in Rome for Landscape Architecture (1990)
 National Design Awards for Environmental Design (2001) 
 University of Wisconsin–Milwaukee Urban Edge Award (2007) 
 United States Artists Fellow (2008)
 Cornelia Hahn Oberlander International Landscape Architecture Prize, awarded by The Cultural Landscape Foundation (2021)

See also
List of fellows of the American Academy in Rome (1971–1990)

References

External links
University of Virginia profile

1958 births
Living people
People from Bergen County, New Jersey
Carnegie Mellon University alumni
Harvard Graduate School of Design alumni
University of Minnesota faculty
University of Virginia faculty
20th-century American architects
American landscape architects
American women architects
Architects from New Jersey